Kneževo is a settlement in the region of Baranja, Croatia. Administratively, it is located in the Popovac municipality within the Osijek-Baranja County. Population is 970 people.

Etymology
Name comes from Croatian word "knez", meaning "prince". Alternative Croatian names for this settlement were: Državno Dobro Belje and Kneževi. In Hungarian, name used for it is Főherceglak.

History
It was mentioned first in 1214 and was named Lak. Modern settlement was founded in the end of 18th and first part of the 19th century and was named Herceg Lak. School was opened in 1820. In 1905, settlement had 605 inhabitants. After World War I, it was named Kneževo.

Demographics
Ethnic groups in Kneževo (1991 census):
Croats (29.68%)
Serbs (29.19%)
Yugoslavs (20.59%)
Hungarians (6.39%)
others (14.13%)

See also
Church of St. George, Kneževo
Osijek-Baranja county
Baranja

References

Populated places in Osijek-Baranja County
Baranya (region)